The French Institute in Edinburgh is a cultural centre promoting  French language and French culture in Edinburgh and in Scotland and part of the wider Institut Français network around the world. It operates alongside the Institut français du Royaume-Uni in London and is administered by the French Foreign Ministry.

It is co-located with Edinburgh's French consulate on the city's Royal Mile. The Institute itself comprises a cultural department, a courses department and a media library. It also hosts the Education officer for Scotland.

History 

The Auld Alliance, which is the beginning of the friendship between Scotland and France against England was signed in 1295. In 1942, the General de Gaulle said about this alliance it was the "oldest alliance in the world". Founded in 1946 by René Massigli, ambassador of France to the United Kingdom, the French Institute relocated from a row of townhouses in Randolph Crescent in Edinburgh's West End to Lothian Chambers in 2018.

Directors of the French Institute for Scotland 
2010 - ... : Vincent Guérin
2008 - 2010 : le secrétaire général a assuré la direction par interim
2006 - 2008 : Anne Laval
2003 - 2006 : Olga Poivre d'Arvor
2001 - 2003 : Ashok Adicéam
1997 - 2001 : Jean-Marc Terrasse
1993 - 1997 : Stéphane Crouzat
1987 - 1993 : Alain Bourdon
1978 - 1980 : Pierre Alexandre
1975 - 1978 : Michel Sciama
1970s : Henry Monteagle
1966 - 1969 : Georges Prudhomme
1960s : René Escande de Messières (vers 1957)1

Activities

Cultural events 
In 2011, for the Edinburgh Festival Fringe, the French Institute presented a show, 'Two Johnnies live upstairs', especially created for the building by the French compagny Mythos festival. This show has been selected as one of the highlights of 2011 by The Scotsman. The French Institute is also involved in the Edinburgh cultural life and is a partner of the Cameo, Edinburgh and hosts the office of the French Film festival UK.

Cultural events list

Exhibitions

Théâtre, cinéma, concerts...

The Media Library

Activities 
The Media Library organises activities for kids in French. L'Oreille Musicale, workshop about French music is new from 2011. On November edition, l'Oreille musicale invited the Breton band Santa Cruz to speak about their musical tastes and influences. The library is open all week days and access is free. By contrast, only the French Institute members can borrow documents.

Collection 

The media library contains over 10.000 documents, mainly in French, about a lot of different aspects of France and French culture. You can find documents about literature, art, history, geography, humanities and children's literature. A lot of references book are available, like dictionaries, encyclopaedias and travel guides. The novel collection contain many novels by Scottish authors translated in French (e.g. Robert Louis Stevenson, Ian Rankin and Val McDermid).

You can read or borrow newspapers like: Libération, Le Monde, Le Point, general-interest magazines: ELLE, Les Inrockuptibles and more specialised magazines like Beaux-Arts and Positif. The CD & DVD shelves contain 1500 CDs (audio-books and music) and almost 1000 films and documentaries.

Language classes 
Every term, about 500 students come to the Institute to learn French.

Bibliography 
Alan John Steele (professeur à l'Université d'Édimbourg), L'Institut français d'Écosse, cinquante ans d'histoire, 1946–1996, Institut français d'Écosse, 1996, 85 p.
Alan John Steele, 60@ifecosse : 1946-2006, Institut français d'Écosse, 2006, 208 p.

References

External links
 An article about the French Institute in Français du Monde n° 157 - 
French Institute website
Franco Scottish Society website
French Alliance in Glasgow
Website of the French Consulate in Edinburgh

Cultural organisations based in Scotland
Organisations based in Edinburgh
France–Scotland relations